George West Independent School District is a public school district based in George West, Texas (USA).

It serves the Live Oak County portion of Pernitas Point.

In 2009, the school district was rated "academically acceptable" by the Texas Education Agency.

Schools 
 George West High (Grades 9-12)
 George West Junior High (Grades 7-8)
 George West Elementary (Grades 4-6)
 George West Primary (Grades PK-3)
 2005 National Blue Ribbon School

References

External links 
 

School districts in Live Oak County, Texas